IDAT, iDAT, or i-DAT may refer to one of the following:

International Dance and Technology Conference
IDAT, ("image data") a part of the Portable Network Graphics (png) format